Mariusz is a Slavic-language masculine name, and may refer to:
Mariusz Czerkawski (b. 1972), Polish ice hockey player
Mariusz Duda (b. 1975), Polish musician
Mariusz Fyrstenberg (b. 1980), Polish tennis player
Mariusz Jędra
Mariusz Jop
Mariusz Kamiński
Mariusz Klimczyk
Mariusz Kukiełka
Mariusz Kwiecień
Mariusz Lewandowski
Mariusz Liberda
Mariusz Linke, first Polish born black belt in Brazilian Jiu-Jitsu
Mariusz Maszkiewicz
Mariusz Niedbała
Mariusz Pawełek
Mariusz Podkościelny
Mariusz Pudzianowski, five-time World's Strongest Man
Mariusz Sacha
Mariusz Siembida
Mariusz Siudek
Mariusz Zganiacz
Mariusz Wach
Mariusz Wodzicki

See also Marius (name)

Polish masculine given names